The Rossica Young Translators Prize is an annual award given to an exceptional translation of a passage of contemporary Russian literature from Russian into English. It was inaugurated in 2009 by Academia Rossica.  The distinction comes with a cash prize.  The prize is awarded in London during the London Book Fair. Anyone under 25 years is eligible for the Rossica Young Translators Prize. Entrants translate one of three extracts (of around three thousand words each) from contemporary Russian novels, as yet untranslated into English. Academia Rossica also awards the biennial Rossica Translation Prize for already published translations in book length.

Winners

References

External links
Official website

See also
List of literary awards
List of years in literature

Translation awards
Literary awards honouring young writers
British literary awards
2009 establishments in England
Awards established in 2009